Driven to Distraction is a non-fiction book, first published in 2009, written by English journalist and television presenter Jeremy Clarkson. The book is a collection of Clarkson's articles for the Sunday Times newspaper, all originally published in 2006 and 2007. The articles consist of car reviews combined with rants on current events.

Cars mentioned

Ascari
 Ascari A10 - "daft for sure, and not at all relevant in the modern world"

Alfa Romeo
 Alfa Romeo Brera Coupe V6 - "you've bought something for one reason only: because it's beautiful"

Aston Martin
 Aston Martin V8 Vantage Roadster - "it's a car you simply have to buy. Just so you can look at it"
 Aston Martin DB9 Coupe - "perfect"

Audi
 Audi R8 - "one of the truly great cars"
 Audi S3 - "woolly and cumbersome"
 Audi TT Mk2 V6 Quattro - " the normal 2-litre version offers just as much, for £5,000 less"
 Audi S6 Avant - "everything is overshadowed and ruined by the suspension"
 Audi RS4 Convertible - "perfect...I'm genuinely struggling to think what might be wrong with it"
 Audi TT Mk2 2.0 Turbo - "I did enjoy driving it"

Bentley
 Bentley Continental GTC - "kick back and cruise"

BMW
 BMW 135i coupé - "the best car BMW makes"
 BMW X5 - "next time the road ahead is closed could you escape up the embankment and across the fields in an X5? I think not. But in a Range Rover you could. I know, because I've done it"
 BMW 335i Convertible - "get the big boy (the M3) instead"
 BMW M6 Convertible "the speed. Oh my God. The speed. It's hyperspace fast"
 BMW 335i Coupe - "as a driver's car, then, this is yet another winner"
 BMW Z4 M coupe - "probably the first disappointing BMW M car I've ever driven"
 BMW Z4 M convertible - "a fast and comfortable cruiser"
 BMW M3 CS - "get a CS? Or go for the Audi RS4?...one of the most delicious choices in any corner of the motoring universe"

Chevrolet

Chrysler
 Chrysler 300C diesel estate - "God it's a wallowy old hector"

Dodge
 Dodge Grand Caravan - this chapter is really an account of an unhappy experience hiring vehicles in Canada.

Ferrari
 1964 Ferrari 275 GTS - "a ton and a half of style, heart and soul"
 Ferrari 599 GTB Fiorano - "gratifying...sorted...sensational"

Fiat
 Fiat Bravo 1.4 Turbo - "not quite as good as a Golf. Except for a couple of things. The way it feels and the way it looks"
 Fiat Panda 1.4 - "you're better off with the Suzuki Swift Sport"
 Fiat Grande Punto - "the biggest car in its class but... the least powerful"

Ford
 Ford Mondeo Titanium X - "refined and comfortable. It feels...like a Volvo"
 Ford Focus Coupé-Cabriolet 2.0 - a refined, elegant, comfortable and remarkably well priced tool"
 Ford S-Max 2.5 Titanium - "it's an MPV you buy because you like it"

Honda
 Honda Civic Type R - "slower and slightly less economical than the old one"

Jaguar
 Jaguar XJ-R 4.2 V8 Supercharged - "Makes you look a little bit cool. Cool, and when you're stuck at the lights surrounded by a million Mercs, a little bit smug as well"
 Jaguar XKR 4.2 litre V8 Supercharged - "wonderfully soft and compliant....a car you can dream about"

Koenigsegg
 Koenigsegg CCX - at that time the fastest car to go round the Top Gear track

Lamborghini
 Lamborghini_Murciélago LP640 - "a mad, expensive, preposterous waste of money, the sheer force of its personality knocks the techno-Ferrari into a cocked hat"
 Lamborghini Gallardo Spyder "for the first time ever (I think I might) buy a Lamborghini)" (he later did indeed buy one)

Land Rover
 Land Rover Defender Td5 90 station wagon - "it's rubbish: uncomfortable, slow, impractical and ... not that cheap"

Lexus
 Lexus LS 460L - "unbelievably comfortable and quiet"
 Lexus GS (Third generation 450 hybrid) - "Does this mean it's saving the planet? hmmm I'm not so sure)
 Lexus_IS Second generation - "a pretty car and we know from every single survey undertaken that no other vehicle on the planet is quite so well made"

Maserati
 Maserati Quattroporte Automatica - "The way it drives. It is absolutely horrible"
 Maserati Quattroporte V Sports GT - "of course it looks absolutely wonderful"

Mazda
 Mazda CX-7m- "looking good and having fun"
 Mazda 2 1.3 - "in the cut and thrust of modern driving....it is terrible"
 Mazda6 MPS - "when you turn the key and go for a drive it's...it's...it's just amazing"
 Mazda MX-5 Third generation - "slightly more practical, slightly better looking version of something you loved anyway"
 Mazda RX-8 - "jolly good if you don't mind spending as much on oil as you do on petrol...."

Mercedes Benz
 Mercedes-Benz CL-Class 600 - "as a car it beats all of them (Porsche, Aston Martin and Maserati)"
 Mercedes-Benz C Class - "There was a time, I agree, when Mercedes stopped taking such care, but they're back in business now"
 Mercedes-Benz R-Class 300CDI - "a 4x4 and not a very good one... the larger-engined R500 at least has a burbling V8 to have some fun with"
 Mercedes-Benz S 500 - "the most jaw-dropping piece of technology to be fitted with four wheels"
 Mercedes M-Class W164 - "efficient and good fun but... too expensive"

Mini
 Mini Cooper S Clubman - "torque-steers like a wayward horse and has no boot, no rear visibility, a silly door and a ridiculous cruising speed"
 Mk II Mini Cooper S - "the biggest drawback is the price"

Mitsubishi
 Mitsubishi Outlander - "reliable and practical but unutterably boring that you never feel inclined to open it up anyway"
 Mitsubishi Evolution IX FQ 360 - "unbelievable, seamless barrel of torque and power"

Nissan
 Nissan Qashqai 2.0 Tekna - "gives you a sense of wellbeing, a sense that while you may live in a normal house with two normal children, at least the car you drive makes you look a little bit interesting"
 Nissan Micra C+C Convertible - "Someone, at some point in this car's development should have had the courage to pull the plug"
 Nissan D40 Navara - "not bad....a torquier diesel engine than any of its chief rivals and a bigger load bay"

Overfinch
 Overfinch Supersport (customised Range Rover Sport)- "(the performance enhancement) is worth every penny"

Pagani

Peugeot
 Peugeot 207 GT - "not as much fun as it should be"
 Peugeot 207 - "overall I sort of liked it"
 Peugeot 407 Coupé - "nothing to make you feel special...big diesel... heavy...smooth and comfortable"
 Peugeot 607 - "surely the most dreary and underwhelming device in the history of mechanised transport."
 Peugeot 807 - "would be the nastiest car in the world were it not for the aforementioned 607."

Porsche
 Porsche 911 (997 Series Turbo) - "smooth and unruffled...comfortable and controlled"

Renault
 Renault Clio III - "it's actually very good fun to drive"
 Mégane Renaultsport 230 Renault F1 Team R26 - "you can't put this much power through the front wheels and hope for the best"
 Renault Clio Sport - "fitting a 2 litre hatchback with all this pseudo-F1 stuff is like fitting your washing machine with a front wing"

REVAi
 The REVAi (known as G-Wiz in the UK) - "too small, too dangerous and I'm sorry but it runs on juice from a power station, hardly a flower in the big green scheme of things"

Rolls-Royce
 Rolls-Royce Phantom Drophead Coupé - arriving in a drophead at the Oscars or at the casino in Monte Carlo would be more impressive, I suspect, than arriving in Keira Knightley"

Škoda
 Škoda Roomster - "Yes it's wobbly and rough but it's extremely clever (and) well-equipped"

Subaru
 Subaru Impreza WRX - "it's no looker either, and the fact of the matter is: the next Evo is"

Suzuki
 Suzuki Swift Sport - "a great little car"

Vauxhall

 Vauxhall Corsa VXR - "an enjoyable, charismatic car that's fun to drive, reasonably priced"

Volkswagen
 Volkswagen Golf Mk5 GT TSI - "where's the power?"
 Volkswagen Polo 1.8 GTI - "if I wanted a fun little car I'd rather have a Mini"
 Volkswagen Phaeton - "better than any of its rivals from Mercedes, Audi, BMW, Jaguar and Maserati". However regarding the diesel version Clarkson says "It is a car designed to be as silent and as efficient and as focussed as a contract killer. So putting a diesel under the bonnet is like putting James Bond in a pair of wellingtons"
 Volkswagen Transporter TDI 174 Sportline - "bloody hell it's quick"

Volvo
 Volvo C70 Second generation - "well-priced...looks great...weird to drive"
 Volvo S80 V8 - "at £48,150 for the SE Sport model...it is exceptional value for money"
 Volvo XC70 - "unless I really needed the Volvo's vast boot I'd save £14,000 and buy a Subaru Legacy Outback"
 Volvo XC90 V8 Sport - "as a piece of design has always been the best school-run car"

One chapter is a wish-list of Jeremy's favourite cars, his "dream garage" as follows:
 Lamborghini Gallardo Spyder - "noisy and shouty mid-engined drop-top supercar"
 Aston Martin V8 Vantage - "savage"
 BMW M5 - "all that power, all that handling, all that comfort"
 VW Phaeton 6.0 W12
 Rolls-Royce Phantom
 Corvette C6
 Vauxhall Monaro
 Porsche Carrera GT
 Pagani Zonda F
 Alfa Romeo Brera
 Audi RS4 - "astonishing 414BHP V8 motor"
 Bugatti Veyron - "the engineering summit, man's hobnail boot in the face of nature"

Part II of the book consists of a small number of Clarkson's articles other than his regular automobile column on topics including travel, restaurant reviews and an account of his trip to Iraq.

2009 non-fiction books
Books about cars